Diego Hartfield and Sergio Roitman were the defending champions. They didn't participate this year.
Pablo Cuevas and Horacio Zeballos won in the final. They defeated Xavier Pujo and Stéphane Robert 4–6, 6–4, 10–4.

Seeds

Draw

Draw

External Links
 Doubles Draw

BNP Paribas Primrose Bordeaux - Doubles
2009 Doubles